Daniel Durben (born April 2, 1959) is an American sports shooter. He competed in the men's 50 metre rifle three positions event at the 1988 Summer Olympics. His brother Peter also competed as an Olympic shooter.

References

1959 births
Living people
American male sport shooters
Olympic shooters of the United States
Shooters at the 1988 Summer Olympics
Sportspeople from Saint Paul, Minnesota